Steven L. Basham  (born 1965) is a lieutenant general in the United States Air Force who serves as the deputy commander of the United States European Command. He previously served as deputy commander of United States Air Forces in Europe – Air Forces Africa from 2019 to 2022.

Born and raised in Bowling Green, Kentucky, Basham was commissioned through Officer Training School in 1989. He has completed numerous flying, staff and command assignments and is a command pilot with more than 3,400 flying hours in the B-1, B-2 and B-52.

In April 2022, Basham was nominated for assignment as deputy commander of the United States European Command.

Awards and decorations

Effective dates of promotions

References

Living people
1965 births
United States Air Force generals
Recipients of the Air Force Distinguished Service Medal
Recipients of the Defense Superior Service Medal
Recipients of the Legion of Merit